Saint-Martin-de-Beauville (literally Saint-Martin of Beauville; Languedocien: Sent Martin de Bauvila) is a commune in the Lot-et-Garonne department in south-western France.

See also
Communes of the Lot-et-Garonne department

References

Saintmartindebeauville